Kezia may refer to:

Kezia or Keziah, a Hebrew name
Keziah, Biblical character, daughter of Job and sister to Jemima and Kerenhappuch
Kezia of Buganda (1906–1998), member of the Ugandan royalty
Kezia Walker, a fictional character in the British television series The Bill
Kezia (album), a 2005 album by Protest the Hero
Typhoon Kezia (1950), a tropical storm
 Kezia, the name ascribed to the wife of Ham (son of Noah) by Ark Encounter

See also
 Cassia (disambiguation)